Abdulaziz Al-Kalthem is a Saudi Arabian footballer.

Career
Al-Kalthem currently plays as a midfielder for Al-Hilal FC in the Saudi Premier League.

References

Living people
Saudi Arabian footballers
1987 births
Al Hilal SFC players
Al-Raed FC players
Al-Wehda Club (Mecca) players
Al-Qadsiah FC players
Al-Orobah FC players
Al-Kawkab FC players
Al Jeel Club players
Al-Diriyah Club players
Saudi Second Division players
Saudi First Division League players
Saudi Professional League players
Association football midfielders